The Harem Years is a firsthand account of the private world of a harem in colonial Cairo.

Huda Shaarawi (1879-1947) was among the last generation of Egyptian women to live in the segregated world of the harem. Her feminist activism grew out of her involvement in Egypt's nationalist struggle, and led to her founding of the Egyptian Feminist Union in 1923.

In 1987 her memoir, The Harem Years, was published under the name Harem Years: The Memoirs of an Egyptian Feminist, 1879-1924. In this book Shaarawi recalls her childhood and early adult life in the seclusion of an upper-class Egyptian household, including her marriage at age thirteen. Her subsequent separation from her husband gave her time for an extended formal education, as well as an unexpected taste of independence. Shaarawi's feminist activism grew, along with her involvement in Egypt's nationalist struggle, culminating in 1923 when she publicly removed her veil in a Cairo railroad station, a daring act of defiance.

References

Egyptian books
Memoirs
Harem
Cairo
1987 non-fiction books